Dear Other Self is a 2017 Filipino romantic comedy film written and directed by Veronica Velasco starring Jodi Santamaria, Xian Lim and Joseph Marco. The film was released in the Philippines on May 17, 2017, and May 26, 2017, in the United States.

Cast

References

External links

Star Cinema films
Philippine romantic comedy films
Filipino-language films
Films directed by Veronica Velasco